Delusions of Grandeur is a 2008 release by Circle II Circle. It was the band's fourth studio release.

Track listing 
All songs written by Zachary Stevens and Paul Michael Stewart except as indicated below.
 Fatal Warning - 03:55
 Dead of Dawn - 04:07
 Forever - 05:16
 Echoes - 05:21
 Waiting - 03:35
 Soul Breaker (Stevens/Stewart/Christian) - 03:29
 Seclusion - 05:03
 So Many Reasons - 03:41
 Chase the Lies - 03:14
 Every Last Thing - 07:23
 Stay - 4:52 (Digipack bonus material)
 Revelations (live video clip) (Digipack bonus material)

Japanese Edition 
 Fatal Warning - 03:55
 Dead of Dawn - 04:07
 Forever - 05:16
 Echoes - 05:21
 Waiting - 03:35
 Soul Breaker (Stevens/Stewart/Christian) - 03:29
 Stay - 4:52  (Japanese Bonus)
 Seclusion - 05:03
 So Many Reasons - 03:41
 Chase the Lies - 03:14
 Every Last Thing - 07:23
 Against The World - 4:04 (Japanese Bonus)
 Darkness Rising - 3:33 (Russian bonus track; taken from Every Last Thing EP)

Personnel 
 Zachary Stevens – lead vocals
 Andrew Lee — lead guitar
 Evan Christopher — rhythm guitar 
 Paul Michael Stewart – bass, backing vocals, keyboards
 Tom Drennan – drums, backing vocals

References

External links 
 Official Circle II Circle website
 Circle II Circle on MySpace
 Delusions of Grandeur on Encyclopaedia Metallum

2008 albums
Circle II Circle albums
AFM Records albums